This is a list of Belgian television related events from 1998.

Events
13 March - Mélanie Cohl is selected to represent Belgium at the 1998 Eurovision Song Contest with her song "Dis oui". She is selected to be the forty-first Belgian Eurovision entry during Eurosong held at the RTBF Studios in Brussels.
Unknown - Esther Sels, performing as Janet Jackson wins the ninth season of VTM Soundmixshow.

Debuts

Television shows

1980s
VTM Soundmixshow (1989-1995, 1997-2000)

1990s
Samson en Gert (1990–present)
Familie (1991–present)
Wittekerke (1993-2008)
Thuis (1995–present)

Ending this year

Births

Deaths